Zinda (English: Alive) is a 2006 Indian Hindi-language neo-noir action thriller film starring Sanjay Dutt, John Abraham, Lara Dutta and Celina Jaitly. The film was directed by Sanjay Gupta and also wrote the film along with Suresh Nair. Vishal–Shekhar composed the film's thematic music, and background music composed by Sanjoy Chowdhury. It was released in India on 13 January 2006.

Zinda has been identified as an unauthorised remake of the South Korean film Oldboy (an official adaptation of the Japanese manga Old Boy). Show East, the producers of Oldboy, who had already sold the remake rights to DreamWorks in 2004, initially expressed legal concerns but no legal action was taken as the studio had shut down.

Plot
Software engineer Balajeet "Bala" Roy (Sanjay Dutt), is happily married to Nisha Roy (Celina Jaitly), with whom he is going to have a baby. But before Nisha let Bala know about her pregnancy, he is captured by unseen assailants and imprisoned in a cell, After one year, Bala gets a visit from Nisha to find out that she was brutally murdered. Bala is kept in total isolation for 14 years without knowing who imprisoned him and why. While in captivity, he practices martial arts which he learns after watching it on the television, with the intention of using it against the people who captured him. He is finally released, again without explanation, and sets out for revenge.

He befriends a Bangkok taxi driver named Jenny (Lara Dutta), who helps him track his kidnappers. Bala tracks down the restaurant that served him food during his entire captivity and follows a delivery moped to his captors. Bala discovers that he was held in a private prison where people can pay to have others incarcerated. Bala tortures the owner Wong Foo (Rajendranath Zutshi) for answers by plucking out his teeth with a claw hammer; he then finds out he was imprisoned for "talking too much", and fights his way out of the building. Bala is injured during the fight, but a mysterious hooded man saves him and takes him to a taxi. The hooded man turns out to be Rohit Chopra (John Abraham). Soon Wong Foo kidnaps Jenny and tortures her. He threatens to remove Bala's teeth with his own clawhammer but is interrupted by Rohit. Bala takes refuge with Jenny, and they have sex. Bala is informed that his daughter is alive. Bala's friend Joy (Mahesh Manjrekar) is killed, and Bala learns that his kidnapper is none other than Rohit.

Rohit reveals his reason for kidnapping Bala. They went to high school together, where Bala had lusted after Rohit's elder sister Reema (Alisha Baig). After Reema rejected him, Bala spreads a false rumour that she was a whore. She became the laughing stock of their school and committed suicide by setting herself on fire. Rohit blamed Bala for her death and engineered his imprisonment as revenge. Rohit tells Bala that he killed Nisha, and sent his daughter, who is now 14, to a brothel. Bala beats Rohit up and knocks him off of a balcony, but grabs his hand and pleads with him to tell him where his daughter is. Defiantly, Rohit lets go of Bala's hand and falls to his death. Bala then kills Rohit's goons and Wong Foo. In the end, Bala learns that his daughter is safe; and Rohit had lied to him about selling her to a brothel to torment him. He finds her sitting on a riverbank, and goes to meet her. He happily lives with his daughter.

Cast
 John Abraham as Rohit Chopra   
 Sanjay Dutt as Balajeet "Bala" Roy
 Celina Jaitly as Nisha Roy
 Mahesh Manjrekar as Joy Fernandes
 Lara Dutta as Jenny Singh
 Rajendranath Zutshi as Woo Fong (as Raj Zutshi)
 Alisha Baig as Reema Chopra

Reception

Critical reception
The film received mixed reviews from critics, although John Abraham and Sanjay Dutt were singled out for praise.

Bollywood Mantra praised the film saying, "Zinda is a film that appears to be the darkest movie ever by Sanjay Gupta. A hard-hitting flick shot in Bangkok, it tells you a story never told before on the Indian screen. And to make Sanjay Gupta's imagination come alive, who else but Sanjay Dutt is roped in to play the lead role. One of the most challenging roles ever by the deadly Dutt, it is sure to haunt you long after the screening is over".

Narbir Gosal of PlanetBollywood.com gave the film a rating of 7.5/10, praising the performances by Sanjay Dutt and John Abraham, while criticising the fact that much of the dialogue and story was copied from Oldboy.

Futuremovies.com gave the film 6/10 and said, "Technically and style-wise Zinda is flawless", and praised Dutt's performance, saying "it is probably the pinnacle of his career".

Subhash K Jha gave it 2.5/5 and stated that "the film belongs to Sanjay Dutt.... If the adventure-action genre in Hindi cinema needed a wake-up call, this is it".

Nikhil Kumar of Apunkachoice.com gave the film 0.5/5 stars, saying "Sanjay Gupta's movie Zinda works primarily because of its gripping, although unoriginal, story and a noteworthy acting performance by its frontman Sanjay Dutt".

Awards 

 52nd Filmfare Awards:

Won

 Best Villain – John Abraham

Soundtrack
The songs were composed by duo Vishal–Shekhar and released by T-Series.
 "Ye Hai Meri Kahani" – Strings
 "Zinda Hoon Main" – Shibani Kashyap
 "Har Saans" – Krishna Beura & Abrar-ul-Haq
 "Kya Main Zinda Hoon" – Shibani Kashyap
 "Maula" – Vinod Rathod
 "Zinda Hoon Main Y" – Shibani Kashyap
 "Chal Rahi Hai Saanse" – Kailash Kher
 "Har Saans (Black Mamba Mix)" – Krishna Beura
 "Ye Hai Meri Kahani (K Rap Mix)" — Strings & Jamie xx
 "Kabhi Muskura ke" - Sanjay Dutt

Similarities with Oldboy
At a November 2005 press conference, representatives of Show East, the production company that released Oldboy, expressed concern Zinda was similar to their film, and said they were investigating the similarities.  They noted that at the time, they did not have the final version of Zinda available to compare Oldboy with. They stated that if they found there was "strong similarity between the two [films]", they would be contacting their lawyers."

The Hindu reviewer Sudhish Kamath and Planet Bollywood reviewer Narbir Gosal both note in their reviews of Zinda that they found the two films to be very similar in terms of plot, as well as in the depiction of specific scenes.

References

External links
 
 Zinda at Extramovies

2000s Hindi-language films
2000s mystery thriller films
2006 films
Indian neo-noir films
Films scored by Vishal–Shekhar
Films scored by Strings
Indian films about revenge
Films about suicide
Indian nonlinear narrative films
Films shot in Thailand
Live-action films based on manga
Indian mystery thriller films
Indian action thriller films
Films about kidnapping in India
Indian remakes of South Korean films
Films involved in plagiarism controversies
Films directed by Sanjay Gupta
2006 action thriller films